DLK may refer to:

Transportation
 Dalkolha railway station,  Indian Railways station code
 Dalston Kingsland railway station, England, National Rail station code
 Deccan Aviation (Lanka), ICAO airline code
 Detroit Lakes (Amtrak station), Minnesota, US, station code

Other
 De lyckliga kompisarna, a Swedish punk band
 Diffuse lamellar keratitis, a condition affecting eyesight
 MAP3K12, an enzyme
 Delta-like protein 1, DLK1